Alberta Prairie Railway Excursions is a heritage railway originating in Stettler, Alberta.

The train runs between Stettler and Big Valley. The trips last five to six hours, with a stopover (all excursions include a buffet meal).  Many trains are pulled by No. 41, a 1920 Baldwin 2-8-0 steam locomotive, and sometimes by CN U-1-f No. 6060, a Montreal Locomotive Works 4-8-2. On days when the steamers are not running, the railroad operates diesel switcher SW-1200 number 1259 and GMD GMD1 number 1118. Until the end of the railroad's 1999 season, it also operated on the  route to Coronation, Alberta, which is now abandoned.

Equipment
No. 41 was built in December, 1920 for the Jonesboro, Lake City and Eastern Railroad, and was there assigned the "41" number.  When that line became part of the St. Louis–San Francisco Railway (Frisco), the locomotive was re-numbered as 77.   After performing freight service with the Frisco for years, the engine was sold in 1947 to the Mississippian Railway where it retained the Frisco number.  Following several further changes in ownership, the locomotive was acquired by Alberta Prairie and renumbered back to 41.

See also

 List of heritage railways in Canada
 Rocky Mountain Rail Society

References

External links
Railway's website

Heritage railways in Alberta
County of Stettler No. 6
Stettler, Alberta